Uke Island, or , is one of the Satsunan Islands of Japan, classed with the Amami archipelago between Kyūshū and Okinawa.

The island, 13.34  km² in area, has a population of approximately 200 persons. Administratively it is part of the town of Setouchi in Kagoshima Prefecture. Much of the island is within the borders of the Amami Guntō Quasi-National Park. Economically, the islanders engage in commercial fishing and seasonal tourism.

Geography
Ukejima is an island southeast of Kakeromajima, from which it is separated by a narrow strait. The coast of the island is surrounded by a coral reef. As with nearby Yoroshima to the northwest, the island is noted for its high density of habu poisonous vipers.

The climate of Ukejima is classified as has a humid subtropical climate (Köppen climate classification Cfa) with very warm summers and mild winters. The rainy season lasts from May through September. The island is subject to frequent typhoons.

History
It is uncertain when Uke Island was first settled. The island came under the control of the Satsuma Domain in 1609 and its incorporation into the official holdings of that domain was recognized by the Tokugawa shogunate in 1624. After the Meiji Restoration it was incorporated into Ōsumi Province and later became part of Kagoshima Prefecture. 

Following World War II, although with the other Amami Islands, Uke Island was occupied by the United States until 1953, at which time it reverted to the control of Japan.

Transportation
Ukejima is connected to Amami-Oshima by frequent ferry services.

References

National Geospatial Intelligence Agency (NGIA). Prostar Sailing Directions 2005 Japan Enroute. Prostar Publications (2005).

External links

Amami Islands
Islands of Kagoshima Prefecture